Kyulevcha Nunatak (‘Nunatak Kyulevcha’ \'nu-na-tak kyu-'lev-cha\) is the rocky, partly ice-free ridge extending 4.17 km in northwest–southeast direction, 1.2 km wide, and rising to 1740 m between the upper courses of Fleece Glacier and Leppard Glacier on Oscar II Coast in Graham Land.  The feature is named after the settlement of Kyulevcha in Northeastern Bulgaria.

Location
British mapping in 1976.

Maps
 British Antarctic Territory.  Scale 1:200000 topographic map.  DOS 610 Series, Sheet W 65 62.  Directorate of Overseas Surveys, Tolworth, UK, 1976.
 Antarctic Digital Database (ADD). Scale 1:250000 topographic map of Antarctica. Scientific Committee on Antarctic Research (SCAR), 1993–2016.

Notes

References
 Kyulevcha Nunatak. SCAR Composite Antarctic Gazetteer.
 Bulgarian Antarctic Gazetteer. Antarctic Place-names Commission. (details in Bulgarian, basic data in English)

External links
 Kyulevcha Nunatak. Copernix satellite image

Nunataks of Graham Land
Oscar II Coast
Bulgaria and the Antarctic